Zina Garrison was the defending champion but did not compete that year.

Pam Shriver won in the final 6–2, 6–3 against Helena Suková.

Seeds
A champion seed is indicated in bold text while text in italics indicates the round in which that seed was eliminated. The top eight seeds received a bye to the second round.

  Pam Shriver (champion)
  Helena Suková (final)
  Claudia Kohde-Kilsch (semifinals)
  Sylvia Hanika (second round)
  Catarina Lindqvist (quarterfinals)
 n/a
  Elizabeth Smylie (second round)
  Etsuko Inoue (quarterfinals)
  Rosalyn Fairbank (second round)
  Anne Minter (third round)
  Eva Pfaff (first round)
  Jana Novotná (third round)
  Marianne Werdel (second round)
  Ann Henricksson (third round)
 n/a
 n/a

Draw

Finals

Top half

Section 1

Section 2

Bottom half

Section 3

Section 4

References
 1988 New South Wales Open Draw (Archived 2009-09-28)

Women's Singles
Singles